Mara Ibañez (born 17 December 1974) is a Mexican racewalker. She competed in the women's 20 kilometres walk at the 2000 Summer Olympics.

References

1974 births
Living people
Athletes (track and field) at the 2000 Summer Olympics
Mexican female racewalkers
Olympic athletes of Mexico
Place of birth missing (living people)